This is a list of VTV dramas released in 2022.

←2021 – 2022 – 2023→

VTV Special Tet dramas 
An extra-story episode in theme of Tết from the series Thương ngày nắng về was released on digital platforms (vtvgo & vtvgiaitri) at 21:30 on the 2nd day of Lunar New Year. The plot was built independently from original storyline.

VTV1 Weeknight Prime-time dramas 
These dramas air from 21:00 to 21:30, Monday to Friday on VTV1.
 Note: Bão ngầm becomes the first non-VFC drama to be aired in this time slot since 2018, also the second non-VFC drama to be counted as a part of Criminal Police: The Series (after Cuồng phong in 2010). It was shown on the occasion of the 60th anniversary of People's Police traditional day.

VTV3 Weeknight Prime-time dramas

First line-up 
These dramas air from 20:00 to 20:30, Monday to Friday on VTV3.

From 1 to 21 Sep, the time slot was filled in by the music show Tần số 20 (The Frequency of 20), re-broadcast from VTV6.

From 17 Nov to 16 Dec, the time slot was paused due to the broadcast schedule for an accompanying program with the 2022 FIFA World Cup.

Second line-up

Monday-Wednesday dramas 
These dramas air from 21:40 to 22:30, Monday to Wednesday on VTV3.

Thursday-Friday dramas 
These dramas air from 21:40 to 22:30, Thursday and Friday on VTV3.

Non-recurring dramas 
The drama was released outside of the regular drama time slot. It airs from 8:05 to 8:50, Monday to Friday on VTV1.

See also 

 List of dramas broadcast by Vietnam Television (VTV)
 List of dramas broadcast by Hanoi Radio Television (HanoiTV)
 List of dramas broadcast by Vietnam Digital Television (VTC)
 List of television programmes broadcast by Vietnam Television (VTV)

References

External links 
VTV.gov.vn – Official VTV Website 
VTV.vn – Official VTV Online Newspaper 

Vietnam Television original programming
2022 in Vietnamese television